Namyślin  is a village in the administrative district of Gmina Boleszkowice, within Myślibórz County, West Pomeranian Voivodeship, in north-western Poland, close to the German border. 

The village has a population of 298.

Notable residents
 Georg von Bismarck (1891–1942), Wehrmacht general

References

Villages in Myślibórz County